Nenets Autonomous Okrug is a Russian federal subject. The titular ethnic group are the Nenets.  Their traditional music includes epic poems comparable to the Finnish Kalevala and the Yakut Olonkho. Traditional Nenets music includes the use of neither musical instruments nor dance.

References

External links
Report on Nenets music
PDF report on Forest Nenets music

Culture of Nenets Autonomous Okrug
Nenets Autonomous Okrug
Arctic music
Indigenous music